James Francis Rawiri Lowe (born 8 July 1992) is a rugby union player who plays as a wing or fullback for Leinster and the Ireland national team. Born in New Zealand, he qualified for Ireland through the three-year residency rule, making his international debut in 2020. He has also played for the Māori All Blacks.

Early career
Born and raised in the town of Nelson on New Zealand's South Island, Lowe is of Māori and English descent and affiliates to the Ngāpuhi and Ngāi Te Rangi iwi. Lowe attended high school at Nelson College where in addition to playing rugby, he was a junior and senior schools athletics champion and also represented New Zealand Under-15s at basketball. After leaving high school, he began playing local club rugby with the Waimea Old Boys club.

Club career

New Zealand 
Lowe debuted for his local province, the Tasman Mako, as a 20 year old in 2012, scoring 2 tries in 6 matches as the men from Nelson reached the Championship semi finals. He was firmly established as a regular in the side for Tasman during their Championship winning year in 2013. He contributed 6 tries in 11 appearances as the Mako narrowly saw off , 26–25 in the final to clinch promotion for the 2014 New Zealand domestic season.

Strong domestic performances during the 2012 and 2013 seasons saw Lowe land a Super Rugby contract with Hamilton-based franchise, the Chiefs, ahead of the 2014 Super Rugby season. With the Chiefs leading 11–10, but the Crusaders on the attack, he scored an intercept try from within his own 22 to help inspire his side to an 18–10 victory. In total he played 10 times and scored 2 tries in his first season in Hamilton as the defending champions were eliminated at the quarter-final stage.

2015 saw him return stronger from Tasman's excellent domestic campaign and he went on to start 12 games for the Chiefs, score 5 tries and also net himself 3 yellow cards. Lowe started 15 times and scored a career high 7 tries to firmly establish himself as a fans-favourite.

Ireland 
On 6 March 2017, Lowe signed for Irish province Leinster in the Pro14 ahead of the 2017–18 season.  Despite arriving late in the season due to commitments with Tasman, he quickly established himself as a fans' favourite scoring 10 tries and beating 41 defenders. He scored a try in the quarter finals of the Champions cup, seeing off the reigning champions Saracens. Lowe achieved winners' medals in both the European Champions Cup and Pro14 in his first season.

In June 2020, Lowe signed a new three-year contract with Leinster covering the 2021–22 through 2022–23 seasons.

International career
Lowe represented New Zealand Schools in 2010 and was part of the successful side which defeated Australia.

Of Māori descent, Lowe affiliates to the Ngāpuhi and Ngāi Te Rangi iwi. He gained selection for the Māori All Blacks in 2014 and 2016 with his debut coming in a 61–21 win against  in Kobe on 1 November 2014, he scored his side's eighth and final try in the 76th minute of the match and also played in the 20–18 victory over the same opposition in Tokyo the following week.

Lowe became eligible to play for Ireland in November 2020 due to the residency rule. 
He made his Ireland debut on 13 November 2020 in a 32-9 victory over Wales in the Autumn Nations Cup, scoring a try in the final minute. He was selected for the 2021 Six Nations and started against Wales.

International Tries 
As of 13 March 2023

Career honours
Tasman

Mitre 10 Cup Championship (1): 2013

Leinster 

Pro14 Champions (4): 2018, 2019, 2020, 2021
European Rugby Champions Cup (1): 2018

Individual 
Pro14 Dream Team (1): 2018
European Rugby Champions Cup leading try scorer (1): 2021–22 (10) 

Ireland
Six Nations Championship (1): 2023
Grand Slam (1): 2023
Triple Crown (2): 2022, 2023
Centenary Quaich (2): 2021, 2022
Millennium Trophy (2): 2022, 2023

Super Rugby statistics

European and Pro14 statistics

International analysis by opposition
Correct as of 18 March 2023

References

External links

1992 births
Chiefs (rugby union) players
Living people
Māori All Blacks players
New Zealand rugby union players
Ngāi Te Rangi people
Ngāpuhi people
People educated at Nelson College
Rugby union wings
Rugby union players from Nelson, New Zealand
Tasman rugby union players
Irish rugby union players
Ireland international rugby union players
Leinster Rugby players
New Zealand expatriate rugby union players
New Zealand expatriate sportspeople in Ireland
Expatriate rugby union players in Ireland
Naturalised citizens of Ireland